Saint-Michel is a commune in the Pyrénées-Atlantiques department in south-western France.

It is located in the former province of Lower Navarre. It borders Çaro to the north, Aincille and Estérençuby to the east, Uhart-Cize and Arnéguy to the west, and Spain to the south.

See also
Communes of the Pyrénées-Atlantiques department

References

External links

 Syndicat Mixte du Contrat de Rivière des Nives (in French)

Communes of Pyrénées-Atlantiques
Lower Navarre
Pyrénées-Atlantiques communes articles needing translation from French Wikipedia